Marist College Emerald is a Catholic, co-educational day school located in Emerald, a rural town located in the Central Highlands, about 3 hours west of Rockhampton, Queensland, Australia.

The college draws students from Emerald, as well as surrounding rural areas including Gindie, Springsure,  The Gemfields, Capella, Blackwater, Comet and many rural properties.

The college is one of only two high schools in Emerald.

History
In 1994 Joe McCorley proposed that the feasibility of opening a secondary college in Emerald be looked at. The only secondary school in Emerald at the time was Emerald State High School.

The proposed site of the original Marist College was on the north side of the Capricorn Highway, adjoining the Agricultural College.

The mayor of Emerald at the time, Paul Bell, was also keen to open a secondary college in Emerald. He suggested utilising land on the east side of the Nogoa River. In coming years, the college would promote housing developments in the area.

Joe McCorley asked the Marist Brothers to administer the college. Bishop Brian Heenan (after which one of the college houses is named after) also asked the Marist Brothers to administer the college.

The college commenced Year 8 classes in 1996 with the first Year 12 class graduating in 2000.

The initial cohort of students was expected to be around 90 students, with around 450 students expected by 2000. The current student numbers stand at around 410 students (2008).

Brother Peter Corr as the first principal of Marist College Emerald. The parish priest at the time was Father Dan Moore (after which Moore house is named).

Facilities
The campus includes such facilities as:

 Computer facilities, wireless throughout the school and a laptop hire scheme for Years 7 to 12
 Music and Drama specialist classrooms
 Senior Art Studio, renovated Junior Art Block and courtyard
 Hospitality Precinct including a commercial kitchen, Restaurant and Alfresco dining area
 Air conditioned Library
 Technology workshops
 Science laboratories
 Canteen, which serves hot and cold meals daily 
 Large undercover area for assemblies, sport and cultural productions
 General teaching areas
 Sporting facilities including oval and basketball courts
 A Sacred Space featuring eight stain glassed windows
 An Inclusive Practices Centre

Sporting tradition
All students participate in the college's Wednesday afternoon sporting program, and can play a variety of sports, including:
Cricket
Cross country running
Netball
Rugby league
Rugby union
Track and Field

Students have the opportunity to progress to district, regional, state and national levels in these sports. The college also has an inter-house competition which includes swimming, cross country running and athletics carnivals.

Academic achievements
As of 2010, seven Marist College students have achieved an overall position of 1, the top level of secondary school academic achievement in the state of Queensland.

Band and instrumental music
The college bands play in many Emerald town functions and participate every year at the Queensland Catholic Schools Music Festival.

School houses
The school has five houses.

Moore House

Motto: Post Prolia Pramia (After the battle come the rewards).

Colour: blue

Emblem: shark

Moore House was named after Daniel Moore, parish priest of Emerald when the college was founded.

Heenan House

Motto: Per Aspera Ad Astra (Through difficulty to the stars).
Colour: gold
Emblem: hornet

Heenan House was named after Brian Heenan, Bishop of Rockhampton when the college was founded.

Farrelly House

Motto: Cituis Altuis Fortuis (Faster, Higher, Stronger).
Colour: red
Emblem: dragon

This house was named after Mark Farrelly, who was involved in the early development and planning of the college.

Chanel House

Motto: Honora Omnes Time Nullus (Respect all, fear none).
Colour: purple
Emblem: cobra

This house is named after Peter Chanel,

Mackillop House

Motto: Ubi Concordia, Ibi Victoria (Where there is unity, there is victory).
Colour: green 
Emblem: green-eyed panther

This is the newest house, and is named after Mary MacKillop, Australia's first saint.

Crest and motto
The crest of Marist College Emerald was designed to incorporate symbols of the main influences on this Catholic College. The central motif represents the Trinity - the flames are symbolic of the Holy Spirit; the Chalice and Host represent the Son, Jesus in the Eucharist; with the hands of the Father shown in a supporting gesture. Sunflowers represent the Shire of Emerald and the stylized "A & M" is the international symbol of the Congregation of the Marist Brothers.

The motto "In Veritate Libertas" translated: "The Truth Will Set You Free."

References 
Marist College Emerald Prospectus
Marist College Student Diary 2008, pg 2–8, 2008

Private schools in Queensland
High schools in Queensland
Schools in Central Queensland
Association of Marist Schools of Australia
Educational institutions established in 1996
1996 establishments in Australia
Emerald, Queensland